Teo Hong Road  is a one-way road located in the Tanjong Pagar area within the Outram Planning Area of Singapore. The road links Bukit Pasoh Road to New Bridge Road, and is lined with a row of conserved shophouses, built during colonial times. The conservation area is part of the Bukit Pasoh Conservation Area. The nearest MRT station is Outram Park MRT station.

References
Victor R Savage, Brenda S A Yeoh (2004), Toponymics - A Study of Singapore Street Names, Eastern University Press, 

Roads in Singapore
Outram, Singapore
Tanjong Pagar